Paul Ott Carruth, Jr. is a former running back in the National Football League and the United States Football League.

Biography
Carruth, Jr. was born on July 12, 1961 in Hattiesburg, Mississippi.  His father, Paul Ott Carruth, Sr. (September 25, 1934 - July 01, 2018) was a Mississippi musician, conservationist, and radio and television host known publicly as Paul Ott.

Career

Carruth played at the collegiate level at Alabama. where he played halfback in 1981 and 1982 on Coach Paul Bear Bryant's last two Alabama teams. After being redshirted in 1983, he was a star on Coach Ray Perkins' 1984 Alabama squad. In his three-year career, Carruth rushed for 1,336 yards on 277 carries and scored 14 touchdowns. He earned Most Valuable Player honors at the 1985 Senior Bowl, before heading off to the NFL.

Carruth played three seasons with the Green Bay Packers. He would spend his final NFL season with the Kansas City Chiefs. He also played for the Birmingham Stallions of the USFL in 1985.

See also
List of Green Bay Packers players

References

Sportspeople from Hattiesburg, Mississippi
Green Bay Packers players
Kansas City Chiefs players
American football running backs
University of Alabama alumni
Alabama Crimson Tide football players
Parklane Academy alumni
1961 births
Living people